Renato Barbosa Vischi (born 30 May 1998) is a Brazilian footballer who currently plays as a defender for Japanese side Pouso Alegre Futebol Clube.

Career statistics

Club

Notes

References

1998 births
Living people
Footballers from São Paulo (state)
Brazilian footballers
Association football defenders
Fluminense FC players
L.R. Vicenza players
S.P.A.L. players
Tombense Futebol Clube players
São Bernardo Futebol Clube players
Morrinhos Futebol Clube players
Ventforet Kofu players
Brazilian expatriate footballers
Brazilian expatriate sportspeople in Italy
Expatriate footballers in Italy
Brazilian expatriate sportspeople in Japan
Expatriate footballers in Japan